The Scott Monument is a Victorian Gothic monument to Scottish author Sir Walter Scott. It is the second largest monument to a writer in the world after the José Martí monument in Havana. It stands in Princes Street Gardens in Edinburgh, opposite the former Jenners building on Princes Street and near Edinburgh Waverley Railway Station, which is named after Scott's Waverley novels.

Design and concept 
The highest platform is reached by a total of 287 steps. It is built from Binny sandstone quarried near Ecclesmachan in West Lothian.

It is placed on axis with South St. David Street, the main street leading off St. Andrew Square to Princes Street, and is a focal point within that vista, its scale being large enough to screen the Old Town behind. Its location appears more random when seen from the south side and Princes Street Gardens, but it dominates the eastern section of the gardens through its scale and elevated position.

History 

Following Scott's death in 1832, a competition was held to design a monument to him. An unlikely entrant went under the pseudonym "John Morvo", the medieval architect of Melrose Abbey. Morvo was in fact George Meikle Kemp, 45 year-old  joiner, draftsman, and self-taught architect. He had feared that his lack of architectural qualifications and reputation would disqualify him, but his design was popular with the competition's judges, and they awarded him the contract to construct the monument in 1838.

John Steell was commissioned to design a monumental statue of Scott to rest in the centre space within the tower's four columns. It is made from white Carrara marble and shows Scott seated, resting from writing one of his works with a quill pen, his dog Maida by his side. The monument carries 64 figures of characters from Scott's novels, sculpted by Scots sculptors including Alexander Handyside Ritchie, John Rhind, William Birnie Rhind, William Brodie, William Grant Stevenson, David Watson Stevenson, John Hutchison, George Anderson Lawson, Thomas Stuart Burnett, William Shirreffs, Andrew Currie, George Clark Stanton, Peter Slater, Amelia Robertson Hill (who also made the statue of David Livingstone immediately east of the monument), and the otherwise unknown Katherine Anne Fraser Tytler.

The stone masons and the Scott monument

The erection of the Scott monument came at a high cost to the stone masons involved, especially to the 'hewing masons' who were responsible for preparing the blocks, with their carvings and statues. This work was done in closed sheds, so that large quantities of fine dust were a continual part of their working environment.  Things were not so bad for the 'building masons' who worked in the open, placing the already prepared blocks of stone.  Because of the hardness of the stone from the Binnie quarry, near Uphall to the west of Edinburgh, used for the monument and other local buildings, Edinburgh masons were especially vulnerable to phthisis, the term used at the time for silico-tuberculosis.  One contemporary observer says that the monument "killed twenty three of the finest hewers in Edinburgh."  Another mentions "one half of the whole number of masons employed... dead of phhisis."

Foundation Stone
The foundation stone was laid on 15 August 1840 by Sir James Forrest of Comiston in his capacity as Lord Provost and as Grand Master Mason of Scotland. Construction began in 1841 following permission by Parliament's Monument to Sir Walter Scott Act and ran for nearly four years. It was completed in the autumn of 1844, with Kemp's son placing the finial in August of the year. The total cost was just over £16,154. The monument was inaugurated on 15 August 1846, but George Meikle Kemp was absent. He had fallen into the Union Canal while walking home from the site and drowned on the foggy evening of 6 March 1844.

Statues and locations 
There are 68 statues on the monument, not counting Scott and his dog, and 64 are visible from the ground. Four figures are placed above the final viewing gallery and are only visible by telephoto or from the viewing gallery (at a distorted angle). In addition, eight kneeling Druid figures support the final viewing gallery. There are 32 unfilled niches at higher level.

Sixteen heads of Scottish poets and writers appear on the lower faces, at the top of the lower pilasters. The heads represent, counter-clockwise from the northwest: James Hogg, Robert Burns, Robert Fergusson, Allan Ramsay, George Buchanan, Sir David Lindsay, Robert Tannahill, Lord Byron, Tobias Smollett, James Beattie, James Thomson, John Home, Mary, Queen of Scots, King James I of Scotland, King James V of Scotland, and William Drummond of Hawthornden.

(S) represents a small figure

Modern administration 
In the early 1990s it was proposed that the stonework should be cleaned. There were views for and against cleaning and a scientific/geological investigation, including cleaning trials on samples of stone, was carried out. It was decided not to clean the stone due to the damage it would sustain. A restoration programme was undertaken involving replacing old repairs and damaged areas with Binny stone for which purpose the original quarry was re-opened. The fresh stonework contrasts with the smoke-darkened original.

The overall cost of the restoration was £2.36 million and was funded by the Heritage Lottery Fund, Historic Scotland and the City of Edinburgh Council.

The monument is now administered by the Culture and Sport division of the City of Edinburgh Council (See External Links for visitor information) who in 2016 installed a new LED lighting system. The design of the lights was "intended to highlight the monument’s architectural features with a soft warm glow" and were first illuminated on 21 September 2016.

In popular culture 
 
The monument is featured prominently in the 2012 film Cloud Atlas, as a location which the character Robert Frobisher frequents.

The artist Alan Reed has said that the monument always reminds him of a Gothic version of one of the Thunderbirds.

See also
List of Category A listed buildings in Edinburgh
List of tallest buildings and structures in Edinburgh

References

External links 

 Visitor Information, including hours of operation and admission fee
 Information from The City of Edinburgh Council
 History of the monument
 Biography of George M. Kemp
 Text of memorial plaque buried beneath the Monument

Buildings and structures completed in 1844
Category A listed buildings in Edinburgh
Monuments and memorials in Edinburgh
Walter Scott
Observation towers in the United Kingdom
Monuments and memorials to writers
Cultural depictions of Robert Burns
Cultural depictions of Lord Byron
Cultural depictions of Rob Roy MacGregor
Sculptures of dogs in the United Kingdom
Pigs in art
Books in art
Gothic Revival architecture in Scotland
Statues of writers